Steven Oo (born 10 November 1984) is a Burmese-American TV personality and fashion designer of Chinese descent. 

Born in Yangon, Myanmar, Oo and his family immigrated to the United States at the age of 15. He received a BA from the University of California, Berkeley and an MFA from the Academy of Art University in San Francisco in Fashion Knitwear Design. His graduation collection debuted at the 2010 New York Fashion Week. He now focuses completely on innovative knitwear clothing designs.

Oo used his success in fashion to become a talk show personality in China. He is a permanent member of Informal Talks, a debate show produced by Bilibili and Hubei Television. He has been praised for his sarcasm and humorous aggression towards other members of the show. He has also made guest appearances on shows such as Go! Wardrobe.

Oo has lived and worked in Shanghai, China since 2013 though he travels often for television filming.

References 

1984 births
Living people
People from Yangon
Burmese fashion designers
University of California, Berkeley alumni
Academy of Art University alumni
Burmese television personalities
American fashion designers
Television personalities from California
People from the San Francisco Bay Area
Burmese emigrants to China
Burmese emigrants to the United States

American emigrants to China
People from Shanghai